Carl V. Thompson is an American engineer currently the Stavros Salapatas Professor of Materials Science and Engineering at Massachusetts Institute of Technology.

Education
SB, Materials Science and Engineering, MIT, 1976
SM, Applied Physics, Harvard University, 1977
PhD, Applied Physics, Harvard University, 1982

References

Year of birth missing (living people)
Living people
MIT School of Engineering faculty
MIT School of Engineering alumni
Harvard School of Engineering and Applied Sciences alumni